Kamar may refer to:

Kamar, Afghanistan
Kamar, Indonesia
Kamar, Tajikistan
Kamar language of India
Kamar (deity) of Georgian mythology
Kamar, Jamaica

See also
Qamar (disambiguation)